John P. Lordon (January 8, 1881 – December 29, 1931) was a Canadian politician. He served in the Legislative Assembly of New Brunswick as member of the Liberal party representing Gloucester County from 1925 to 1931.

References

20th-century Canadian politicians
1870 births
1935 deaths
New Brunswick Liberal Association MLAs